The Band Non-Commissioned Officer Higher Vocational School is a boarding military education institution that trains non-commissioned officers for military bands in the Turkish Land Forces, Naval, Air Forces as well as the Gendarmerie General Command. The school accepts foreign military students to be trained from allied and contracted countries.

History 
During the Ottoman period under Sultan Mahmud II, a westernization of music took place, which began in 1826 under the leadership of Mahmud. The "Musik-i Humayun" was founded as the first band school. In 1924, President Mustafa Kemal Atatürk requested the band school be moved to Ankara. The band school has continued its activities under various names in the Ankara campus since 1924. The Military Music Preparation Secondary School, which was opened on September 1, 1939, had its first graduates in 1943. After five years of primary education, three years of secondary education was completed in this school. Young graduates who completed the training process were assigned to various bands as petty officer sergeants. Subsequently, this school was named the "Military Harmony Petty Officer Preparation Secondary School" in 1952. Since 2016, the school, whose high school section was closed, has continued its activities within the body of the National Defense University. Today, there are a total of 40 bands in the Turkish Armed Forces, 23 of which are in the Land Forces, 8 in the Naval Forces, 5 in the Air Force, and 4 in the Gendarmerie General Command.

After the 15 July coup attempt in 2016, the school could not graduate between 2016 and 2018.

School commanders

See also 

 Canadian Forces School of Music

References 

National Defense University (Turkey)
Universities and colleges in Istanbul
Educational institutions established in 2016
2016 establishments in Turkey
Military units and formations established in 2016
Performing arts education in Canada
Music schools in Canada
1954 establishments in Canada
Vancouver Island